Chupi Chupi Aashey (Silently he comes) is a 1960 Bengali murder mystery film directed by Premendra Mitra. This film was released by Aurora Film Corporation and music scored by Nachiketa Ghosh. Sandhya Mukherjee sings the title song. Chupi Chupi Aashey was adapted from Agatha Christie's radio play and short story Three Blind Mice and stage play The Mousetrap.

Plot 
Two partners, Prabir and Kanika, start a hotel business and advertise through handbills. The name of the hotel is the Kalyaneshwari Health Resort. While at the same time, an unknown person commits a murder in Kolkata, and two workers find copies of that handbill which fell from the pocket of the murderer. The police decide to send a detective to the Kalyaneswari guest house to stop him from committing another murder. The guest house is surrounded by water due to heavy flooding. All communications gradually stop because of continuous rainfall. Before the flood, several guests, namely Dr. Bajpayee, Miss Dhar, Beni Babu, Radheshyam Viraswami, and Madhusudan Dutta had checked into the hotel.  Most of the guests have a dark past and connections to each other by a mysterious incident at an orphanage. All of them are masked with false names and identities. A police detective comes by a small boat, but the next day someone releases the boat. Meanwhile, the main culprit kills Miss Dhar in the guest house and tries for a second victim.

Cast 
 Chhabi Biswas as Beni Babu
 Jahar Ganguly as Vira Swami
 Tarun Kumar as Inspector Ghoshal
 Rabin Majumdar as Prabir
 Dhiraj Das
 Tapati Debi
 Prabir Kumar
 Asha Debi

References

External links

1960 films
Bengali-language Indian films
Indian mystery films
1960s mystery films
Films directed by Premendra Mitra
1960s Bengali-language films
Films based on works by Agatha Christie